Sidewalks of London, also known as St Martin's Lane, London After Dark, and Partners of the Night, is a 1938 British black-and-white comedy drama starring Charles Laughton as a busker or street entertainer who teams up with a talented pickpocket, played by Vivien Leigh. The film co-stars Rex Harrison and Tyrone Guthrie in a rare acting appearance. It also features Ronald Shiner as the barman (uncredited). It was produced by Mayflower Pictures Corporation.

Plot
Charles Staggers is a London street performer, or busker, with his partners, Arthur Smith and Gentry.

He protects Liberty, known as Libby, a runaway and pickpocket, when she steals a gold cigarette case from successful song writer Harley Prentiss. He takes her into their troupe, making their trio into a quartet.

Libby attracts the attention of Prentiss and his wealthy friends, who can give her a life and career away from the streets. When she leaves, cruelly rejecting Charles's marriage proposal, he doesn't want to go on with the act anymore, and becomes an alcoholic. Libby's career, however, is a big success; she is offered a Hollywood contract. She asks Prentiss to marry her but he declines, saying he doesn't want to be thrown away, like Charles, as a mere stepping stone for her career.

In the press of crowds waiting to see her as a big star, Libby sees Charles and her old partners busking on the street. Charles asks her for her autograph but the mob shoves him aside.

Cast
 Charles Laughton as Charles Staggers
 Vivien Leigh as Liberty (Libby)
 Rex Harrison as Harley Prentiss
 Larry Adler as Constantine
 Tyrone Guthrie as Gentry
 Gus McNaughton as Arthur Smith
 Edward Lexy as Mr. Such
 Maire O'Neill as Mrs. Such
 Helen Haye as Selina
 Cyril Smith as Black Face
 Ronald Shiner as the Barman (uncredited)

Production
According to Vivien Leigh's biographer Alexander Walker, Laughton and Vivien Leigh didn't get along while working together. Walker wrote that when an attempt was made to obtain Leigh's services for a film version of Cyrano de Bergerac, Laughton stated that she would have to dye her hair blonde. Leigh asked for a blonde wig, but Laughton insisted she dye her hair. The discussions fell through and Leigh felt slighted.

When Leigh was approached to make Sidewalks of London, she did not want to work with Laughton and she felt no attachment to the role. Nevertheless, she was persuaded otherwise. In Alexander Walker's biography of Leigh, Larry Adler is quoted as saying that Leigh was difficult to work with. He said, "She didn't like Charles and he didn't like her. But he was much more professional. One weekend there were a few close-ups of Vivien to be done outside a theater and Charles, who invariably went down to the country with Elsa (Lanchester) at weekends, stayed up in town to 'feed' Vivien lines from behind the camera. I doubt if she'd have done as much for him. [Laurence] Olivier would show up on the set and they'd disappear into her dressing-room and it was quite a business to get her back to work." Olivier would show up on the days that Leigh was to shoot love scenes with the handsome Rex Harrison.

Adaptations
The film was adapted into the stage musical Busker Alley with songs by the Sherman Brothers. After several false starts with Tommy Tune as director and starring Tune and Melissa Errico, the musical had debuted at the York Theatre in New York on 13 December 2006 starring Jim Dale and Glenn Close. A CD which recreated this one-night-only performance was released by Jay Records in 2007.

References

External links
 
 
 
 Sidewalks of London on Lux Radio Theater: 12 February 1940

1938 films
1930s crime comedy-drama films
British crime drama films
British romantic comedy-drama films
British black-and-white films
Films about entertainers
Films set in London
Films shot at Associated British Studios
Films directed by Tim Whelan
Films produced by Erich Pommer
Films scored by Jack Beaver
1930s romantic comedy-drama films
Films with screenplays by Charles Laughton
1930s English-language films
1930s British films